"" ("Hymn to the Mountain"), or "" ("Anthem of Cantabria"), is the official anthem of the Spanish autonomous community of Cantabria. It was composed in 1926 by Juan Guerrero Urresti at the behest of the then Provincial Council of Santander (Diputación Provincial de Santander) and subsequent arrangements by José del Río Sainz, in the region's official anthem.

Lyrics

See also
 Anthems of the autonomous communities of Spain

References

Spanish anthems
Regional songs
Cantabrian culture
Spanish-language songs
Cantabrian symbols
1926 songs
National anthem compositions in D major